Jugend (German: "Youth") (1896–1940) was an influential German arts magazine. Founded in Munich by Georg Hirth who edited it until his death in 1916, the weekly was originally intended to showcase German Arts and Crafts, but became famous for showcasing the German version of Art Nouveau instead. It was also famed for its "shockingly brilliant covers and radical editorial tone" and for its avant-garde influence on German arts and culture for decades, ultimately launching the eponymous Jugendstil ("Youth Style") movement in Munich, Weimar and Germany's Darmstadt Artists' Colony.

The magazine, along with several others that launched more or less concurrently, including Pan, Simplicissimus, Dekorative Kunst ("Decorative Art") and Deutsche Kunst und Dekoration ("German Art and Decoration")  collectively roused interest among wealthy industrialists and the artistocracy, which further spread interest in Jugendstil from 2D art (graphic design) to 3D art (architecture), as well as more applied art. Germany's gesamtkunstwerk ("synthesized artwork") tradition eventually merged and evolved those interests into the Bauhaus movement.

History 

George Hirth founded the journal in 1896 to launch a new cultural renaissance in Munich. From the start, he intended the magazines to be collectible, and therefore distinct. In the first seven volumes, he featured more than 250 artists, the vast majority unknown. After the First World War, the magazine went out of style with young artists.  Among its regular contributors was Bruno Paul.

Hirth helmed the magazine for 20 years and died in 1916.  Franz Schoenberner was made publisher, and an array of art editors played a role in its cover and illustrations, including Hans E. Hirsch, Theodore Riegler and Wolfgang Petzet, with Fritz von Ostini and Albert Matthew editing the text, and Heinrich Franz Lang serving as photo editor.

Associated influences 

As the early arts and crafts ambitions faded and German Art Nouveau took hold of the magazine's aesthetic, iconic imagery of nude youth in idealized nature scenes were depicted more frequently. Along with other symbols of nature at its most magical — nymphs, centaurs, and satyrs — the associations between Jugendstil and the Lebensreform ("life reform") movement, which encouraged a return to a "natural" life-style, grew.  In addition to modern illustrations and the ornamentation of Art Nouveau, the magazine featured impressionist and expressionist art, as well.

The journal also covered satirical and critical topics in culture, such as the increasing influence of the churches (especially Catholicism), and the political right in the Centre Party.  The Yale Literary Magazine critic summarized the editoral attitude by noting that "Jugend's political and social platform [was] one opposition—opposition to everything." For all that, Jugend's contribution to the literature of the early modern period remained modest, especially compared to Albert Langen's competing journal Simplicissimus, which was also founded in 1896.

Jugend's editorial identity originally focused on national and Bavarian regional issues. That changed in the mid-1920s, when it began catering to, and then entered into dialogue with groups of young artists breaking with traditional approaches to art in the late 19th and early 20th centuries in the Jungendstil in multiple German cities, as well as a series of so-called secessions in Paris, Vienna, Munich, Berlin, Dresden and elsewhere. After 1933, the magazine was forced to cater to the Nazis, which restricted its editorial vision to the neoclassical propaganda approved by the regime, in the Great German Art Exhibition of 1937, which was presented in counterpoint to the 650 pieces confiscated from German museums in the Degenerate Art Exhibition.

Legacy 

 The use of integrating and matching typefaces into the illustration continues to influence graphic design.
Germany's gesamtkunstwerk ("synthesized artwork") tradition, which came to the fore in German Art Nouveau led to a reexamination of "how to reconcile art with industry, ornamentation with functionalism."

Gallery 
(Selection was limited by availability.)

See also 

Gesamtkunstwerk
List of magazines in Germany
Pan (magazine)
Secession (art)
 Simplicissimus (magazine)
Ulenspiegel

References

External links

 Jugend – Münchner illustrierte Wochenschrift für Kunst und Leben – digital version at University Library Heidelberg

1896 establishments in Germany
1940 disestablishments in Germany
Art Nouveau magazines
Defunct magazines published in Germany
Visual arts magazines published in Germany
German-language magazines
Magazines established in 1896
Magazines disestablished in 1940
Magazines published in Munich